Levittown, a community in the San Juan MSA and part of the municipality of Toa Baja, is one of the largest planned communities in Puerto Rico. Per the 2020 census, the population was 25,591.

It was developed by Levitt & Sons in 1963.
Levittown is divided into eight sections called secciones (the eighth section was renamed Urb. Fronteras) and several sub-divisions called urbanizaciones. Part of what is known as Levittown is located in the municipalities of Toa Baja and Bayamon(8th Section now known as Fronteras de Bayamon). Levittown is known for its large, light blue painted water tower (now converted into a public library) that was one of the first water towers in Puerto Rico used to provide potable water to residences. To the west sits Levittown Lakes or Los Lagos de Levittown, a small man-made lake formed by draining the marshland over which Levittown was built. The drainage canal that feeds the lake is called Caño El Hato, which extends into the center of Levittown. To the east, the Bayamon River divides Levittown from the fishing village of Palo Seco, next to the Cataño municipality.

It has a Blue Flag-rated public beach known as Punta Salinas and also one of the bigger public sports centers of the metropolitan area of San Juan with tennis courts and a stadium for track and field meets. Its Olympic-sized pool has been in use since its construction in 1977. Its high school, Dr. Pedro Albizu Campos High School, was built in 1970 and is named after an important political figure on the island. The school's football team, the Levittown Spartans, have been among the top high school football teams on the island. In 1975 they became the co-champions along with the Pirates from Antilles High School, in Fort Buchanan. Also, the Spartans track teams, coached by Wilfredo Meaux (who would later on coach the team from University of Puerto Rico at Bayamon) were perennial powers during the 1970s and 80s. Levittown High's Basketball team has produced several excellent players including Ramon Rivas, who played for the NBA with the Boston Celtics. In 2018, the Levittown Baseball Team was the world champions for the first ever Colt World Series Championship, beating the Seoul, Korea team 5 -4. Colt World Series Archives

Levittown's main avenue is "Bulevar de Levittown". It has the largest collection of small business in the community.  Los Dominicos Avenue is the second main avenue and connects Levittown to other areas, e.g., Sabana Seca sector and the city of Bayamón. Levittown has more than three shopping centers, including Plaza Davison and Rio Hondo Mall.  Highway 165 connects Levittown with the towns of Toa Baja, Cataño and Dorado, Puerto Rico. Punta Salinas' radar domes and El Morro can be seen from this route. At night, the Morro Castle's lighthouse and the Palo Seco power plant are visible. The coastal area along the road near the Bayamon River is popular with local surfers and is known as Cochino Beach (Pigs Beach), probably because of the brownish waters caused by the sediments flowing out from the river.

Punta Salinas, the public beach, is home to a Puerto Rico Air National Guard unit, the 140 ADS, that provides air traffic control support to the FAA, military and law enforcement operations. It is also the home of a Civil Air Patrol squadron, one of several in the municipality of Toa Baja.

Levittown has tropical weather all year round. The water tower, also known by pilots as the "Levittown Water Tank" provides a visual navigational checkpoint to aircraft flying either to Isla Grande Airport or to Luis Muñoz Marín International Airport. The area around Lago De Plata suffered some flood damages due to the rising water levels during Hurricane Maria.

Transportation
It is served by Route D37 of the Puerto Rico Metropolitan Bus Authority and private commuter buses connecting the community with Cataño and the Tren Urbano Rapid Transit station in Bayamon. The neighborhood is patrolled by the Toa Baja Municipal Police Department with a precinct in the western part of the neighborhood, and the 271st precinct of the Puerto Rico Police Department located behind the water tank and the high school.

Demographics

Prior to the 2020 U.S. Census, the United States Census Bureau changed the name of the community from Levittown to Mansión del Mar.

2020 census

Note: the US Census treats Hispanic/Latino as an ethnic category. This table excludes Latinos from the racial categories and assigns them to a separate category. Hispanics/Latinos can be of any race.

2010 Census
As of the census of 2010, there were 26,960 people living in the community. The average family size was of 3.09. The population density was 13,279/mi2. There were 11,701 housing units. The racial makeup of the area was 73.9% White, 13.7% African American, 7.7% from other races, and 3.7% from two or more races. The majority (98.6%) were of Hispanic ethnicity. Of those, 93.5% were Puerto Rican, 0.5% Cuban, 0.3% Mexican and 4.4% of other Hispanic ethnicity.

In the community the population was 53.5% females and 46.5% males. The median age of the population was 38.4 years. The mean income for a family in the community for 2010 was $36,605. 24.2% of families were below the federal poverty level. The community was generally a lower-middle-class and working-class neighborhood. From 2008 to 2010, 81 percent of people 25 years and over had at least graduated from high school and 21.6 percent had a bachelor's degree or higher. On the average, 62.9% of its college-age population attend institutions of higher learning. 66.5 percent of Levittown workers drove to work alone in 2010, 17.4 percent carpooled, 3.7 percent took public transportation, and 11.5 percent used other means. The remaining 0.9 percent worked at home. Among those who commuted to work, it took them on average 38.0 minutes to get to work. Among the most common occupations were: Sales and office occupations, 36.1 percent; Management, professional, and related occupations, 30.0 percent; Service occupations, 17.3 percent; Production, transportation, and material moving occupations, 9.3 percent. 69.8 percent of the people employed were Private wage and salary workers; 23.5 percent was Federal, state, or local government workers; and 6.4 percent was Self-employed in own not incorporated business workers.

Notable people
Justo Betancourt - Salsa musician, lived in Levittown
Oscar Cartaya - Bass player for Spyro Gyra
Kany García - Songwriter
José Huertas "Invader #1" - Professional Wrestler
Sixto Lezcano - Major League Baseball Player
Ray Reyes - Singer and ex-Menudo, raised in Levittown
Ramón Rivas - NBA Basketball Player, grew up in Levittown
Jerry Rivera - Salsa musician, raised in Levittown and Sabana Seca
Edwin "Chapo" Rosario - former World Boxing Champion
Julita Ross - National Folk Ballad Singer, aka "La Dama de la Danza"
Olga Tañón - Merengue & Latin Pop Singer

Gallery

See also

List of communities in Puerto Rico
List of barrios and sectors of Toa Baja, Puerto Rico

References

Toa Baja and its communities, United States Census Bureau
History of Levittown
2008-2010 American Community Survey 3-Year Estimates
Photo of original Model Homes
FHA Commissioner Philip N. Brownstein and other federal government officials touring Levittown in 1965
Utility poles go up in 1st Section of Levittown in 1965, Water Tank in background
Puerto Rico High School Football League

External links

Toa Baja, Puerto Rico
Levittown
Planned communities
1963 establishments in Puerto Rico
Populated places established in 1963